The Devonian Harrell Formation is a mapped bedrock unit in Pennsylvania, Maryland, West Virginia, and Virginia.

Description
The Harrell Formation was first described by Charles Butts in 1918.  Hasson and Dennison (1978) state "The Harrell Shale consists of very dark gray, thinly laminated, platy- to sheety-weathering shale underlain in certain areas by the grayish black shale of the Burket Member."

Fossils
Hasson and Dennison reported the following fossils from several outcrops of the Harrell:
Bivalvia:  Buchiola livonae (?), B. retrostriata, Paracardium doris, Pterochaenia fragilis, Lunlulicardium (?)
Cephalopoda:  Bactrites aciculum, Probeloceras lutheri
Cricoconarida (class of Mollusca):  Styliolina fissurella

Notable Exposures
Type locality is at Horrell Station, Blair County, Pennsylvania.

Age
Relative age dating places the Harrell in the late Devonian.

References

Devonian System of North America
Shale formations of the United States
Devonian Maryland
Devonian geology of Pennsylvania
Devonian geology of Virginia
Devonian West Virginia
Devonian southern paleotemperate deposits